Joan Ingram may refer to:
 Joan Ingram (broadcaster), Scottish broadcaster
 Joan Ingram (tennis) (1910–1981), English tennis and table tennis player
 Joan Ingram (actress) (1903–1974), British actress